The Palazzo Cicala is a 16th-century palace in Genoa.  It has served as residences for several and as a business office.  It is now a hotel.

History 
The palace dates back to the mid-16th century, when it belonged to the aristocratic Cicala family. It later went to the De Mari family, and in the 18th century it was purchased by the Ferro family, who restored and refurbished it in Rococo style. 

At the end of the 19th century, the palace was converted into offices, first for a major insurance company, Italia Assicurazioni, and then for the Odino Valperga freight agency. In June 1999 the palazzo returned to its original residential function. In 2001 Locanda di Palazzo Cicala, Hotel the Charme, first opened.

External links 
 Official website

Palaces in Genoa
Hotels in Italy